The Atlas of Canada is an online atlas published by Natural Resources Canada that has information on every city, town, village, and hamlet in Canada. It was originally a print atlas, with its first edition being published in 1906 by geographer James White and a team of 20 cartographers. Much of the geospatial data used in the atlas is available for download and commercial re-use from the Atlas of Canada site or from GeoGratis. Information used to develop the atlas is used in conjunction with information from Mexico and the United States to produce collaborative continental-scale tools such as the North American Environmental Atlas.

External links

 The Atlas of Canada
 The 1906 Atlas of Canada 
 The 1915 Atlas of Canada

Natural Resources Canada
Geography of Canada